The Lady with the Black Gloves is a 1919 Austrian film directed by Michael Curtiz.

Cast
 Lucy Doraine
 Harry Walden
 Iván Petrovich

References

External links

1919 films
Austrian black-and-white films
Films directed by Michael Curtiz
Austrian silent feature films
Austrian horror films
Silent horror films